Guernica Editions is a Canadian independent publisher established in Montreal, Quebec, in 1978, by Antonio D'Alfonso. Guernica specializes in Canadian literature, poetry, fiction and nonfiction.

Guernica's current publishers are Connie McParland (Montreal) and editor in chief Michael Mirolla (Toronto).

Guernica Editions began as a bilingual press and in the first decade published works in English and in French. It also published many Quebec authors in English translations. They include : Nicole Brossard, Jacques Brault, Yolanda Villemaire, Rejean Ducharme and Suzanne Jacob. D'Alfonso is a bilingual writer and translator who works in English and French.
In 1994 Guernica Editions  moved operations from Montreal to Toronto and focused on English language books and only occasionally printed  books in French.
One of Guernica's significant contributions to Canadian letters is its promotion of ethnic minority writers including Italian-Canadian authors, Dutch, Arab, Greek, African-Canadian writers and others.(Clarke 2012)

The Guernica Writers Series

In 2000 Antonio D'Alfonso established the 'Writers Series' a chain of monographs each devoted to a Canadian author and edited by senior Canadian academics. The Series was co-directed by 
Antonio D'Alfonso and Joseph Pivato. After 2010 Pivato became sole editor of this series.  By 2019 this series includes over 50 volumes with monographs on such Canadian authors as Sheila Watson, Robert Kroetsch, M.G. Vassanji,  Jack Hodgins,
George Elliott Clarke, Nino Ricci, Alistair MacLeod, Aritha Van Herk, F.G. Paci, Al Purdy, Mary di Michele, David Adams Richards, Anne Hebert, Daniel David Moses, Caterina Edwards, Don McKay, P.K. Page, Nicole Brossard, Drew Hayden Taylor, Joy Kogawa, Gary Geddes, Kristjana Gunnars, Pier Giorgio DiCicco  (Hutcheon) and others.
It is now called the 'Essential Writers Series.'

A number of Guernica anthologies have been used as texts in college and university literature courses. They include The Anthology of Italian-Canadian Writing (1998), Voices in the Desert: An Anthology of Arabic Canadian Women Writers (2002) (Sugars), Pillars of Lace: The Anthology of Italian-Canadian Women Writers (1998) (Gundale),
Ricordi: Things Remembered (1989), Social Pluralism and Literary History (1996) (Verduyn) Adjacencies: Minority Writing in Canada (2002) and other titles. (Pivato 2007)

Literary Awards

Les Ages de l'amour by Dorothy Livesay won the 1989 Governor General translation award for  Jean Antonin Billiard.
Aknos by Fulvio Caccia won the 1994 Governor General award for French poetry.
Island of the Nightingales" by Caterina Edwards won the 2001 Howard O'Hagan Award for Short Fiction.
Remembering History by Rhea Tregebov won the 1982 Pat Lowther Award for Poetry.
Contrasts: Comparative Essays on Italian-Canadian Writing by J. Pivato won the 1985 Bressani Prize.
Keeping Afloat by M. Travis Lane won the 2002 Atlantic Poetry Award.
The Stalinist's Wife, translated by Luise von Flotow, was shortlisted for the 2013 Governor General's Award for Translation (French to English). 
Where the Sun Shines Best by Austin Clarke was shortlisted for the 2013 Governor General's Award for Poetry (English Language).
Eye by Marianne Micros was shortlisted for the 2019 Governor General's Award for Fiction (English Language). .

References

Clarke, George Elliott. "Let Us Compare Anthologies: Harmonizing the Founding African-Canadian and Italian-Canadian Literary Collections." Directions Home: Approaches to African-Canadian Literature. Toronto: University of Toronto Press, 2012.

Hutcheon, Linda. "The Canadian Mosaic: A Melting Pot on Ice: The Ironies of Ethnicity and Race." Splitting Images: Contemporary Canadian Ironies. Toronto: Oxford University Press, 1991.

Pivato, Joseph. "Twenty Years of Change: The Paradox of AICW." Strange Peregrinations. eds. Delia De Santis, Venera Fazio, Anna Foschi Ciampolini. Toronto: Centre for Italian-Canadian Studies, University of Toronto, 2007.

Sugars, Cynthia C. ed. The Oxford Handbook of Canadian Literature. New York: Oxford U. P. 2016. 5-6.

Verduyn, Christl. ed. Literary Pluralities. Peterborough: Broadview Press, 1998. 57, 290.

Wilke, Gundale. "Triculural Landscape." (Pillars of Lace) Canadian Literature 178 (Autumn 2003) 164-66.

External links
Official website
[hpcanpub.mcmaster.ca/hpcanpub/case-study/guernica-editions]
Guernica Editions Digital Collection, McMaster University

Book publishing companies of Canada
Small press publishing companies
Companies based in Toronto
Publishing companies established in 1978